Paperboy is a 2013 young adult novel by author Vince Vawter. The novel was a Newbery Medal Honor Book in 2014.

Description 
The author Vince Vawter was inspired to write the novel Paperboy because it is an autobiographical novel, almost a memoir, about his lifelong speech impediment. Although a struggle during his childhood, as an adult, Vawter considers his speech impediment to be a welcomed challenge and source of inner strength.

Plot 

The story takes place in 1959 in Memphis. "Little Man" Victor, an eleven-year-old boy who stutters, takes over his best friend Rat's paper route while Rat is visiting his grandparents. Little Man has various encounters with Rat's customers. The paper route poses challenges and introduces Little Man to life's daily obstacles.

He has a run-in with the neighborhood junk man, Ara T, a bully and thief who Little Man was warned to stay away from by his Mam. Ara puts the boy's life, as well as Mam's, in danger. Victor begins to wonder what it means to have a soul. He thinks about his talks with Mr. Spiro, a merchant sailor who has settled into the area; who he met on his paper route. He sees Mrs. Worthington walking hand in hand with her husband and hopes she's happy. He befriends a boy on the route who he has learned is deaf, and he is finally able to tell his mother that the food she thinks is his favorite is not. Though he has recently discovered that his dad is not his birth father, he embraces their loving relationship and strives to deepen it. Mr. Spiro, he learns, is going to leave soon on one of his merchant ships, and he gives Little Man a cut up dollar bill with 4 words on it, student, servant, seller, and seeker. By the end  of the book, he is even able to speak several full sentences in front of his class, finally verbalizing his own name for the first time. Victor tells Mam he's learned that what he says is more important than how he says it and that his soul doesn't stutter. In the end, it turns out that Victor had typed up the entire book.

Characters 

 Victor Vollmer/ "Little Man"- a stuttering 11-year-old boy who takes on a new responsibility, which is his friend's paper route, and is intrigued by all the new things happening in the neighborhood around him.         
 Mam - a protective housekeeper who goes to great lengths to make sure "Little Man" is treated right.
 Arthur "Rat" - "Little Man's" friend whose paper route he is covering for.
 Ara T - a junkman who causes trouble for "Little Man" and Mam.
 Mrs. Worthington - a depressed woman who turns to alcohol quite frequently. 
 Mr. Spiro - an intelligent traveler who has patience and helps "Little Man" understand things that he is intrigued about.
 TV Boy (Paul P.) - a boy who is deaf and watches TV all day to practice lip reading and is later befriended by Victor.
 Parents - mom who is real and a father who is not Victor's dad.
 Mr. Worthington - Mrs. Worthington's husband
 Coach - Victor's coach for baseball
 Big Sack - friends with Ara T, and cuts Victor's parents' lawn

Critical reception 

Rob Buyea, author of Because of Mr. Terupt and Mr. Terupt Falls Again states Paperboy is "An unforgettable boy and his unforgettable story. I loved it."
The story is "Beautifully written by a first-time author/retired newspaper man who stutters, Vince Vawter knows much about what he writes." - The Reading Countess  One parent on Common Sense Media states "He learns many life lessons during his temporary job as a paperboy (set in the south, during the 60s), and we cheer for him as he stands up for someone he loves, despite extreme peril. Well written, compelling, and plenty of fresh, fascinating characters."

Awards 

 A Newbery Honor  Award Winner 
 An American Library Association Association for Library Service to ChildrenNotable Children's Book
 An International Reading Association Children's and Young Adults’ Choice
 An International Reading Association Teachers’ Choice
 A Junior Library Guild Selection
 A Bank Street College of Education Best Book of the Year
 A National Parenting Publications Award Honor Book
 A BookPage Best Children's Book
 An ABC New Voices Pick
 An American Library Association-Association for Library Service to Children Notable Children's Recording
 An American Library Association-YALSA Amazing Audiobook
 Amazon.com Best Books of the Year 2013: Ages 9–12 
Canadian book Honor Award
CCBC Award
UNKB Award
Big Book Award NYC

Notes 

2013 American novels
2013 children's books
Newbery Honor-winning works
American young adult novels
American autobiographical novels
Stuttering
Fiction set in 1959
Delacorte Press books